Shahnagar is a town in Shahnagar Tehsil in  Sagar Division, Madhya Pradesh, India.

References

Cities and towns in Panna district